Caesar Rentie (born November 10, 1964) is a former American football tackle. He played for the Chicago Bears in 1988 and for the New York/New Jersey Knights from 1991 to 1992.

References

1964 births
Living people
American football tackles
Oklahoma Sooners football players
Chicago Bears players
New York/New Jersey Knights players